Guido Di Vanni (born 11 June 1988 in Rosario) is an Argentine footballer currently playing for 12 de Octubre as a forward. He is nicknamed "Ramses".

Titles
 Banfield 2009 (Torneo Apertura Primera División Argentina Championship)

See also
 List of expatriate footballers in Paraguay
 Players and Records in Paraguayan Football

External links
 
 

1988 births
Living people
Argentine footballers
Argentine expatriate footballers
Club Atlético Banfield footballers
Ferro Carril Oeste footballers
Gimnasia y Esgrima de Jujuy footballers
Sportivo Luqueño players
PFC CSKA Sofia players
Club Guaraní players
Independiente Santa Fe footballers
Deportivo Capiatá players
Unión Comercio footballers
12 de Octubre Football Club players
Argentine Primera División players
First Professional Football League (Bulgaria) players
Primera Nacional players
Paraguayan Primera División players
Peruvian Primera División players
Categoría Primera A players
Argentine expatriate sportspeople in Paraguay
Argentine expatriate sportspeople in Bulgaria
Argentine expatriate sportspeople in Colombia
Argentine expatriate sportspeople in Peru
Expatriate footballers in Paraguay
Expatriate footballers in Bulgaria
Expatriate footballers in Colombia
Expatriate footballers in Peru
Association football forwards
Footballers from Rosario, Santa Fe